HMS Leander was a Portland-class 50-gun fourth rate of the Royal Navy, launched at Chatham on 1 July 1780. She served on the West Coast of Africa, West Indies, and the Halifax station. During the French Revolutionary Wars she participated in the Battle of the Nile before a French ship captured her. The Russians and Turks recaptured her and returned her to the Royal Navy in 1799. On 23 February 1805, while on the Halifax station, Leander captured the French frigate Ville de Milan and recaptured her prize, . On 25 April 1805 cannon fire from Leander killed an American seaman while Leander was trying to search an American vessel off the US coast for contraband. The resulting "Leander affair" contributed to the worsening of relations between the United States and Great Britain. In 1813 the Admiralty converted Leander to a hospital ship under the name Hygeia. Hygeia was sold in 1817.

Early service
She was commissioned in June 1780 under Captain Thomas Shirley. Leander cruised for some time in the North Sea.

At the end of 1781 Leander and the sloop-of-war  sailed for the Dutch Gold Coast with a convoy, consisting of a few merchant-vessels and transports. Britain was at war with the Dutch Republic and Shirley launched an unsuccessful attack on 17 February on the Dutch outpost at Elmina, being repulsed four days later. Leander  and Shirley then went on to capture the small Dutch forts at Moree (Fort Nassau - 20 guns), Kormantine (Courmantyne or Fort Amsterdam - 32 guns; 6 March), Apam (Fort Lijdzaamheid or Fort Patience - 22 guns; 16 March), Senya Beraku (Berricoe, Berku, Fort Barracco or Fort Goede Hoop - 18 guns; 23 March), and Accra (Fort Crèvecœur or Ussher Fort - 32 guns; 30 March). Leander also destroyed the French store-ship , off Senegal, supposed to be worth £30,000. Shirley garrisoned those facilities with personnel from Cape Coast.

Shirley sent two sets of dispatches back to Britain. One set went in the transport sloop Ulysses, which was under the command of Captain Frodsham. The French frigate Fée captured Ulysses and took her into Brest, but not before her captain had weighted the dispatches and thrown them overboard. Shirley's first lieutenant, Mr. Van court, took the second set in the cartel transport Mackerel, which also carried the Dutch governors of the forts to Europe.

Shirley then sailed to the West Indies where towards the end of 1782 as senior captain he became commanding officer prior to the arrival of Admiral Hugh Pigot. Pigot promoted him to captain of the 90-gun .

Pigot appointed Captain John Willet Payne to replace Shirley. On 18 January 1783, Leander was escorting a cartel when the two vessels encountered a large French warship at midnight. After an inconclusive engagement of two hours, Leander and her opponent separated. Pigot reported that the French vessel was probably a 74-gun ship of the line. Furthermore, rumour had it that she was the Couronne and that she had gone on to Puerto Rico. On 4 March Leander captured the brig Bella Juditta. Leander was one of the five warships and the armed storeship Sally that shared in the proceeds of the capture on 23 March of the ship Arend op Zee. Captain J. Reynolds took command briefly in 1784 before Leander was paid-off in Portsmouth in April.

She was recommissioned in August 1786, after repairs in 1785. Captain Sir James Barclay commissioned Leander in August 1786 and then sailed her for Nova Scotia on 9 April 1787. She served as flagship for Sir Herbert Sawyer in 1788 until paid off in September. Captain Joseph Peyton, Jr. immediately recommissioned her as the flagship for his father Rear-Admiral Joseph Peyton, Sr. She sailed for the Mediterranean on 22 December.

French Revolutionary and Napoleonic Wars
Leander was recommissioned in May 1795 under Captain Maurice Delgano. On 12 May 1796 she was part of Admiral Duncan's squadron, when , of the squadron, captured the Dutch frigate Argo and the brig Mercury. The Royal Navy took both Argo and Mercury into service: Argo became  and Mercury became . Leander shared by agreement in the proceeds of the capture of the Vrow Hendrica, captured on 22 October.

In November 1796 Leander came under the command of Captain Thomas Boulden Thompson. She then escorted a convoy to Gibraltar on 7 January 1797.

Leander joined the Mediterranean Fleet under Earl St Vincent, and was assigned to the squadron under Horatio Nelson. Thompson took part in Nelson's attack on Santa Cruz in July 1797. Thompson was among the leaders of the landing parties, under the overall direction of Nelson and Thomas Troubridge. Wind hampered the initial attempts to force a landing; the Spanish defenders immediately subjected the successful landing in the evening of 22 July to heavy fire. Still, Thompson's party were able to advance and spike several of the enemy's cannon. However, the British forces had become dispersed throughout the town, and were forced to negotiate a truce to allow them to withdraw. Thompson himself was wounded in the battle. Leander lost seven men killed, 6 wounded (including Thompson), and one missing.

Nile
Under Captain Thomas Thompson Leander took part in the Battle of the Nile on 1 August 1798. In the battle she suffered only 14 men wounded.

Capture
In the subsequent action, Leander lost 35 men killed and 57 wounded, including Thompson. The French suffered 100 killed and 180 wounded, but captured Leander. The French took her into service under her existing name.

The French treated the prisoners badly and plundered almost everything but the clothes the British had on their backs. When Thompson remonstrated with Captain Lejoille of Généreux, Lejoille answered nonchalantly, "J'en suis fâché, mais le fait est, que les Français sont bons au pillage." ("It makes me angry, but the fact is, the French are good at pillaging.") They refused treatment for Thompson, who had been badly wounded. Leanders surgeon, Mr. Mulberry, was able to remove a musket ball from Thompson's arm only after the vessels reached Corfu on 1 September and he was smuggled aboard the vessel where the French were holding Thompson. Most of the officers returned to Britain on parole but the French detained a number of seamen, and in particular Thomas Jarrat, the carpenter, after he refused to reveal to them the dimensions of Leanders masts and spars. Captain Lejoille tried, albeit unsuccessfully, to get some of the British crew that he had detained to assist him when a Turko-Russian fleet appeared off Corfu. The British refused.

The subsequent court-martial aboard  at Sheerness most honourably acquitted Thompson, his officers, and his crew. The court also thanked Berry for the assistance he gave during the battle. As Thompson was rowed back to shore, the crews of all the ships at Sheerness saluted him with three cheers. He was subsequently knighted and awarded a pension of £200 per annum.

Leander was at Corfu when a joint Russian and Ottoman force besieged the island. On 28 February 1799, the Russians and Ottomans attacked Vido, a small island (less than a kilometer across) at the mouth of the port of Corfu. A four-hour bombardment by several ships suppressed all five shore batteries on the island. Leander and the corvette Brune tried to intervene but were damaged and forced to retreat to the protection of the batteries of Corfu.

The Russians and Turks recaptured Leander and Brune when Corfu capitulated to them on 3 March 1799. The Russians restored Leander to the Royal Navy. They also gave Brune to the Ottomans.

Return to British service
Leander was recommissioned in the Mediterranean under Commander Adam Drummond in June 1799. In September Captain Michael Halliday took command.

From July 1801 to June 1802 she refitted at Deptford. She recommissioned in May under Captain James Oughton as flagship for Vice-Admiral Sir Andrew Mitchell.

In July she sailed for Halifax. Captain Francis Fane took command a year later, in August 1803, with Captain Alexander Skene replacing him in November. On 16 August 1804 Leander was in company with  when they recaptured Hibberts.

She then had three more captains within the year: George Ralph Collier, Oughton again, and from November, John Talbot.

On 23 February 1805, while on the Halifax station, Leander discovered the French frigate Ville de Milan, under Captain Pierre Guillet, and the British , which Ville de Milan had captured the day before. The engagement between Ville de Milan and Cleopatra had left both ships greatly damaged. Consequently, when they encountered Leander they struck to Leander without a fight. Leander came upon Cleopatra first, and as soon as she struck, the British prisoners on board her, i.e., her original crew, took possession of her. She then followed Leander towards Ville de Milan, which too struck.

On 3 June Leander captured Nancy. Three days later she captured Elizabeth. The next day Leander captured Volunteer. On 12 October, Leander captured Vengeance.

Thereafter, in recognition of the capture of Ville de Milan and the recapture of Cleopatra, the Admiralty promoted Talbot to command of ship of the line .

The Leander affair

HMS Leander then came under the command of Captains William Lyall and Henry Whitby. However, in the summer of 1804, the warships began stopping and boarding all American ships going into New York just outside the United States's three-mile territorial limit, and searching them for any French goods. If anything suspicious was found, the ship was detained and taken to Halifax.

On 25 April 1806, Leander fired a warning shot over the bow of a merchantman, signalling it to stop. The cannonball passed into the harbour, decapitating John Pierce, the helmsman of the Richard, a small coasting sloop inside the harbour. The sloop's captain, who was Pierce's brother, made his way to New York City, where he gathered a mob that paraded Pierce's body and head through the streets. The next day, an angry mob intercepted a party from Leander returning to their ship with a load of provisions; the mob seized the provisions and placed them on twenty carts, the lead one bearing a pole flying an American flag and a British one below it. The carts were wheeled around the city as members of the mob beat drums. When the crowd reached Alms House, the provisions were given to the poor, and the British flag was burned. Protest meetings were held over the incident. John Pierce was given a large public funeral. Four of Leanders officers caught ashore were imprisoned for their own protection, and were later secretly released. On 14 June President Thomas Jefferson issued a proclamation against Captain Whitby. He ordered Leander, Driver and Cambrian immediately to quit US waters and forbade them ever to return.  He extended the same prohibition to all vessels that Captains Whitby, John Nairne and Simpson might command. Whitby was court martialed in England on the charge of murdering John Pierce, but was acquitted.

On 26 April Leander, Cambrian and Driver captured the American ship Aurora.

In May Captain Salusbury Pryce Humphreys took command of Leander at Halifax as she became the flagship for Admiral George Berkeley. Captain Richard Raggett then sailed her back to Britain in 1807.

Fate
By 1807 Leander was out of commission at Portsmouth. In 1808 she was in Plymouth. In October 1810, Leander was fitted as a medical depot ship at Portsmouth. In 1813 the Admiralty commissioned a new  so the old Leander was given the name Hygeia. Hygeia was sold on 14 April 1817 to a Mr. Thomas for £2,100.

Notes

Citations

References
 Crooks, John Joseph (1973) Records Relating to the Gold Coast Settlements from 1750 To 1874. (London: Taylor & Francis).

External links
 

Frigates of the Royal Navy
1780 ships
Captured ships